The Gettysburg Spring Railroad (Springs Horse Railway) was a Gettysburg Battlefield tourist conveyance in the Battle of Gettysburg, First Day, area.  The trolley extended from the western terminus on the east side of Herr Ridge at the Gettysburg Springs Hotel eastward to the Gettysburg borough after crossing Willoughby Run, McPherson Ridge, Pitzer Run, Seminary Ridge, Stevens Run (stone bridge), to the slopes of Baltimore Hill where it turned northward at the borough square to end at the Gettysburg Railroad Station. In addition to a stop at the Lutheran Theological Seminary at Gettysburg, by 1879  the horse railroad had a stop near Pitzer Run at the "Trotting Park" which was replaced after 1904 with a horse track east of Stevens Run at the county fairgrounds (now the Gettysburg Recreation Park).

History
By October 9, 1867, "the Gettysburg Katalysine Spring Company had purchased...land from Willoughby run to Gettysburg, lying between the Hagerstown and Chambersburg roads ... to lay down a Horse Railway",  and the Gettysburg Spring Railroad was organized by October 20, 1868.  Construction had commenced by October 16 at the west end, with the first car running on June 25, 1869. (the hotel opened on June 28).

Stones of the railway's Willoughby Run bridge were still visible in the stream in 1991.

References

Defunct companies based in Pennsylvania
Defunct Pennsylvania railroads
Railway companies established in 1868
Railway companies disestablished in 1880
Railway lines opened in 1869
1869 establishments in Pennsylvania